Delta State is an adult animated television series, based on the comic by Douglas Gayeton featuring four amnesiac roommates with the ability to enter an ethereal realm known as the Delta State. They face the dual tasks of piecing together their past lives and battling a group of Delta State denizens called Rifters, who seek to control the human mind. The main characters are Claire (Ilona Elkin), Martin (Dusan Dukic), Luna (Lizz Alexander), and Philip (Nicholas Wright).

The series debuted September 11, 2004 on Teletoon, the Canadian cartoon television network. It is the first animated television series to be entirely rotoscoped, taking over 2 ½ years to complete.

Delta State is a Canadian and French co-production with designs, storyboards, etc., done by Alphanim in Paris. Shooting and recording were performed by Nelvana in Montreal. The series was created by Douglas Gayeton, who also directed the original pilot and wrote the bible for the show.

The show has won the Special Award for a TV program at the Annecy International Animated Film Festival, and the Frames 2004 for best Asian Production.

The series aired in France on France 2 and Canal+.

Synopsis
Four people each become aware that they possess superhuman abilities of the mind, and are charged by their friend and mentor Professor Brodie with saving the world from Rifter forces. Brodie trains them to battle Rifters in the Delta State, a reference to the brain wave pattern achieved during deep sleep. The main characters, Professor Brodie, and the Rifters are able to enter and exit this state of consciousness at will. As in dreams, rules of physics or logic do not necessarily apply; yet, as in lucid dreaming, a measure of control over the situation can be achieved while in this state.

Characters

The Group
Luna Palacios: Red hair in ponytail, 22 years old and of Mexican descent. She has the power of precognition. She is the only one among the group who doesn't have control over her power; her visions of the future appear to her either randomly or shortly before the actual event. Luna is described to be shy and reserved. However, it is implied that her personality drastically changed after she lost her memories and she was much more open and social in her past life. Luna works in a pub where all the characters gather regularly during the series. Before she lost her memories, she was a bank teller at the Bank of Mexico. There was a robbery at the bank and the getaway car hit and killed Carlita, Luna's little sister. There is often tension between her and Martin due, apparently, to their previous relationship. She is also the one Phillip prefers to confide in with his more sensitive and personal issues.
Philip Graff: Shaggy black hair, 20 years old, a perpetually unemployed slacker. He has the power of psychometry, the ability to see the past experiences of selected objects. His mother abandoned him on a bus when he was a baby and he grew up in an orphanage. She's seen in robes being chased by others in matching robes, suggesting a possible cult membership of some kind, and that Philip's birth went against this group's beliefs. He has an aversion to lockers, likely because he spent much of third grade being stuffed into them. It's later revealed that of the four he was the first one found, and that he's the "most special" in the grand scheme of things.
Claire Donally: Blue hair in buns, 21 years old. She has the power of remote viewing. Now Martin's girlfriend. Her best friend is Luna. Claire's previous boyfriend was David, who was murdered by a friend named Thomas, because Thomas wanted the full share of the treasure he and David had found while scuba diving. She's shown to be the least capable of dealing with the new life/Rifter situation they're in.
Martin Gold: Spiked white hair, 21 years old, and the de facto leader of the group. He has the power of telepathy (mind reading). Presently the boyfriend of Claire, though he was Luna's in his past life. He was a baseball catcher before a couple of thugs, hired by his own father (for not also pursuing the family practice), broke his arm, ending his career.
Professor Robert Brodie: The group's guardian and mentor. He was involved in a government project but left. He's shown to be able to hold powerful Rifters like Sven at bay.

Rifters
Sven Ragnar: Arguably the most powerful rifter. Commonly assumed to be the "brother" of Maria and heads the acquisition of human minds by rifters. He seeks to kill Brodie, and bears a grudge against Martin. He's able to change his appearance, he doesn't hesitate to kill people, and is able to kill other rifters, in both the Delta State and in reality. His goal and motivation appears to be world domination.
Maria Ragnar: Though one of the "bad guys", she has deep feelings for Philip and has put herself in danger for him on more than one occasion. She is a powerful rifter in her own right, including the ability to change her appearance in reality, but harbors a healthy fear of Sven's power.
Karla Schneider: The rifter featured in "First Contact" who displeased Sven and was disintegrated for her transgression.
Professor Stork: A rifter who was expelled by Luna and Philip in "A Case Study."
Dr. Ludwig Von Hayek: A mad scientist rifter who worked at Icharus, perfecting cold fusion as an unlimited power source for rifters. Von Hayek was destroyed by Martin, Philip, Luna, and Claire in "Fusion."
Louisa Forterre: The girl Philip has fallen for. Philip expels a rifter from her at the end of "The Girlfriend."
Aldous Brant: A human possessed by a rifter 15 years before the beginning of the series. He has Enzio's Rachnosis, a neural degenerative disease, and has less than a year to live. The rifter in Aldous Brant took advantage of a situation to jump into Raymond Woodly, leaving Aldous dying in a coma.
Raymond Woodly: Aldous Brant's best friend and campaign manager. Woodly became possessed when a rifter jumped into him from Brant. The Rifter was NOT expelled at the end of "Vote Rifter."
Dr. Van Heusen: A rifter destroyed by Philip, Luna, and Claire in "Cabin Fever."

Other
Dan: Luna's boyfriend. He also works with Martin at "Soundz", a music store. He is shown to be a fairly skilled computer hacker. Luna explains her situation truthfully to him, which he simply believes without hesitation or further question.
Chantal Thomas: A TV psychic. Brodie described her as "sensitive to the vibrations of the membrane of our reality". She was found and killed by Sven in "The Reading."
Jack Staffer: A friend of Philip's. They met when they both worked at Icharus, in "Fusion."

Quotes
"Four young amnesiacs hold the fate of humankind in their hands. Their mission is to protect you from the "Rifters" who want to control the human mind. They may appear to be harmless and self-absorbed but they have astonishing, paranormal powers and an invincible motivation: To retrieve the secrets to their past lives, hidden deep in the parallel dimension of the Delta State."
— Professor R. Brodie, opening credits

Release
The series was released to DVD soon after its broadcast began, with three-episode volumes being released intermediately. "First Contact" (episodes 1 – 3)  was released on May 16, 2006, followed by "The Reading" (episodes 4 – 6) on October 10, 2006. The first season, containing all thirteen of its episodes, was made available in a two-disc box set on February 13, 2007. The first season was later re-released by Kaboom Entertainment on October 6, 2009. As of 2009, the releases are now out of print. 

In the late summer/early fall of 2010, the complete series became available for download from the iTunes Store, however it was later delisted a year later.

The series is currently available to watch on YouTube via the channel Retro Rerun.

Production

The Comic 

The comic was written by Douglas Gayeton, with artwork by Matt Rockman, in 1997 while both worked at Sunshine Amalgamedia. Before the comic released, the rights to it were bought by Alphanim, who commissioned Gayeton to turn the comic into an animated series. He shot the pilot with friends of his in Los Angeles on a shoestring budget and used Macromedia Flash for rotoscoped animation. The pilot would be completed in 2000, one year before the release of Waking Life. After writing the original show bible and directing the pilot for the series, Gayeton moved on to other projects, though he remains a fan of the work. As of 2022, The comic and the pilot have yet to be released as they are owned by Alphanim's successor Gaumont Animation.

The Series 
The series utilized rotoscoped animation, shot on a budget of $11 million (CAD) with a multicamera setup directed by Wayne Moss, was done using a blue screen studio in Montreal with minimal props and locations. It was also shot in the 16:9 aspect ratio and converted to fullscreen to stretch out the characters. The actors had black lines drawn on their faces to distinguish noses, eyebrows and jaw lines and hair was customized in order to make it easy for the animators. The animation was later done in Paris, directed by Pascal David & Giles Cazaux, which used a mix of Flash, Photoshop and After Effects for the series, with character designs being done by Jan Van Rijsselberge.  Originally, the series was renewed for a second season and a theatrical film by Alphanim, however, negotiations with Nelvana were broken down, and the project was cancelled, with Nelvana buying out Alphanim's share of the series.

Soundtrack
The music for the show was composed by French DJ and producer Kid Loco. Only two tracks from the original soundtrack have been released. The first one is the Delta State theme song, which is an extended version of the main theme. It is available to buy from the iTunes store. The second track is called "Another Snake" and has been released on a compilation CD called "Ethnic Odyssey — Natural Born Travellers" in 2007. Other songs from the show have not been officially released.

See also

Animism, a similar Canadian animated show for teens with mature concepts

References

External links
 Gaumont Animation web site
 
 TV.com
Kerrilea's Delta State page
Delta State at Animation World Magazine
 Matt Rockman's homepage
 Douglas Gayeton homepage

2000s Canadian adult animated television series
2000s Canadian animated comedy television series
2004 Canadian television series debuts
2005 Canadian television series endings
2000s French animated television series
2004 French television series debuts
2005 French television series endings
Canadian adult animated comedy television series
French adult animated comedy television series
English-language television shows
Teletoon original programming
France Télévisions television comedy
Gaumont Animation
Television series by Nelvana